Sayamia is a genus of freshwater crabs, found in South-East Asia.  Three species are included on the list of least concern (lc) arthropods, but S. melanodactylus is endangered.

Species
 Sayamia bangkokensis (Naiyanetr, 1982): Thailand (lc)
 Sayamia germaini (Rathbun, 1902): Cambodia, Thailand, Vietnam (lc)
 Sayamia maehongsonensis (Naiyanetr, 1987): Thailand (VU)
 Sayamia melanodactylus Ng, 1997: Thailand (EN)
 Sayamia sexpunctata (Lanchester, 1906): N. peninsular Malaysia (lc)

References

External links

Gecarcinucidae
Freshwater crustaceans of Asia